The women's 1500 metres event at the 2009 European Athletics U23 Championships was held in Kaunas, Lithuania, at S. Dariaus ir S. Girėno stadionas (Darius and Girėnas Stadium) on 17 and 19 July.

Medalists

Results

Final
19 July

Heats
17 July
Qualified: first 4 in each heat and 4 best to the Final

Heat 1

Heat 2

Participation
According to an unofficial count, 25 athletes from 18 countries participated in the event.

 (1)
 (2)
 (1)
 (1)
 (2)
 (1)
 (1)
 (2)
 (2)
 (1)
 (1)
 (2)
 (1)
 (2)
 (1)
 (2)
 (1)
 (1)

References

1500 metres
1500 metres at the European Athletics U23 Championships